Fan Chao (born 8 February 2004) is a Chinese footballer currently playing as a forward for Changchun Yatai.

Club career
Born in Hefei, Anhui, Fan began his career with Changchun Yatai at the age of ten, after being spotted by youth coach Sun Maofeng. In 2016, following impressive performances at the Audi Youth Cup, Fan was invited to train with Spanish side Barcelona. He continued to progress through the academy of Changchun Yatai, making his debut in a 3–0 loss to Beijing Guoan. He went on to play in three more games in the 2022 season, including the 4–0 defeat to Shanghai Port on the final day of the season. Despite his team's poor results towards the end of the season, Fan garnered praise for his performances.

International career
Fan has represented China from under-14 to under-20 level. He scored four goals in four appearances in qualification for the 2020 AFC U-16 Championship, which was eventually cancelled.

Following impressive performances for the under-19 team, the Chinese Football Association wrote to his club, Changchun Yatai, to thank them for supporting the development of young Chinese players.

Career statistics

Club
.

References

2004 births
Living people
People from Hefei
Footballers from Anhui
Chinese footballers
Association football forwards
Chinese Super League players
Changchun Yatai F.C. players
21st-century Chinese people